The Buzi River, alternatively Buzikeng River is a river located in Taichung, Taiwan. The river flows westward from Toukeshan in Beitun District to near Xinfeng Bridge in Taiping District, where it becomes the Dali River. Even though the Buzi River is considered as a tributary of the Dali River, the Dali River is actually rerouted to merge with the Buzi River further upstream, and the overlapping segment is known as the Buzi River.

References 

Rivers of Taiwan
Landforms of Taichung